Himatanthus is a genus of flowering plant in the family Apocynaceae, first described as a genus in 1819. It is native to Panama and South America.

Species
 Himatanthus articulatus (Vahl) Woodson - widespread from Panama east to French Guiana and south to Bolivia
 Himatanthus attenuatus (Benth.) Woodson - Venezuela, Colombia, N Brazil
 Himatanthus bracteatus (A.DC.) Woodson - Venezuela, Colombia, Guianas, Brazil, Peru, Ecuador
 Himatanthus drasticus (Mart.) Plumel - Guianas, Brazil
 Himatanthus lancifolius (Müll.Arg.) Woodson
 Himatanthus obovatus (Müll.Arg.) Woodson - Brazil, Bolivia, Guyana
 Himatanthus phagedaenicus (Mart.) Woodson  - S Venezuela, NW Brazil
 Himatanthus semilunatus Markgr. - Amazon Basin 
 Himatanthus stenophyllus Plumel - Colombia, NW Brazil, Guyana, Suriname
 Himatanthus tarapotensis (K.Schum. ex Markgr.) Plumel - Colombia, Bolivia, Brazil, Peru, Ecuador

References

 
Apocynaceae genera